The Gawad sa Kapayapaan is a decoration of the Armed Forces of the Philippines (AFP) which recognizes outstanding services to internal peace and security. The recipient must have proffered valuable contribution in promoting societal understanding and reconciliation or must have made exceptional achievement in pursuit of national accord and development. It is awarded by the Chief of Staff of the AFP to AFP personnel and any citizen of the Philippines or of friendly foreign nations.

Description of the award 

The award is a circular medal showing a portion of the Philippine flag. A white flying dove with a Sampaguita branch in its beak is superimposed on the medal. The ribbon is light blue in color with a thick white line in the middle.

References 

Military awards and decorations of the Philippines